Dražen Bagarić (born 12 November 1992) is a Croatian professional footballer who plays as a centre-forward for Finnish club Honka.

Club career
On 13 July 2022, Bagarić signed with Honka in Finland.

Career statistics

Club

References

External links

Dražen Bagarić at Sofascore

1992 births
Living people
Footballers from Vienna
Croatian footballers
Croatia under-21 international footballers
Association football forwards
Croatian expatriate footballers
Expatriate footballers in Israel
Expatriate footballers in Belarus
Expatriate footballers in Bosnia and Herzegovina
Expatriate footballers in Slovenia
Expatriate footballers in Romania
Expatriate footballers in Finland
Croatian expatriate sportspeople in Israel
Croatian expatriate sportspeople in Belarus
Croatian expatriate sportspeople in Bosnia and Herzegovina
Croatian expatriate sportspeople in Slovenia
Croatian expatriate sportspeople in Romania
Croatian expatriate sportspeople in Finland
Second Football League (Croatia) players
Croatian Football League players
First Football League (Croatia) players
Israeli Premier League players
Belarusian Premier League players
Premier League of Bosnia and Herzegovina players
Slovenian PrvaLiga players
Liga I players
RNK Split players
NK Dugopolje players
F.C. Ashdod players
FC Shakhtyor Soligorsk players
NK Široki Brijeg players
NK Olimpija Ljubljana (2005) players
FC Hermannstadt players
FK Sarajevo players
FC Honka players